Sun Yizhou (born 23 October 1983), also known as Sean Sun, is a Chinese actor.

Early life and education
Sun was born in Chengdu, Sichuan on October 23, 1983. He graduated from Shanghai Theatre Academy, majoring in acting.

Career
Sun made his acting debut in the 2007 television series Embroiderer Lan Xin.

In 2009, Sun rose to fame for his role in the sitcom iPartment, which enjoyed explosive popularity in China and spanned several seasons.

In 2012, he starred in his first idol drama, Confession of Love From the Start.

In 2014, Sun starred in Scarlet Heart 2, the modern sequel of popular historical drama Scarlet Heart. He won his first award for acting at the China TV Drama Awards the same year.

In 2017, Sun starred in the historical romance drama General and I, which had high ratings in China.

In 2019, Sun starred in the spy drama Awakening of Insects.

Personal life
On September 9, 2009, Sun married his university classmate Cao Xiaowen.

Filmography

Film

Television series

Awards and nominations

References

External links

1983 births
Living people
Male actors from Chengdu
Shanghai Theatre Academy alumni
Chinese male film actors
Chinese male television actors
21st-century Chinese male actors